Adam Eli (born September 26, 1990) is an American activist and writer known for his work in LGBT activism. His first book, The New Queer Conscience, was released in June 2020.

Career 
Eli is the founder of Voices4, a nonviolent direct-action activist group committed to advancing global queer liberation. It was originally launched to protest the anti-gay violence in Chechnya and has since created international chapters in London and Berlin. He got his start in activism as a member of Gays Against Guns, ultimately managing their social media accounts. Eli has a large following on Instagram and says social media is an important tool in his activism. "Social media is one of the most important tools the resistance has. Social media is about self-expression, sharing information, crafting identity and community...If used effectively, the power of social media is limitless."

Out magazine described Eli as "one of the most prominent young faces in a wave of contemporary activism not seen since ACT UP." He is known for his "signature pink yarmulke." Before beginning in activism, Eli worked in real estate.

In 2019, a video Eli posted went viral showing him being followed and harassed on the street in New York City.  “Stay in the closet...Make sure your closet is in another closet...this is not Judaism!" the unidentified man can be seen yelling. The video has been viewed over a million times and was shared by Mayor Bill De Blasio, who wrote, "There’s no place for hate in this city." Eli said he felt compelled to share the video of the confrontation as a reminder that the struggle for LGBT rights isn't over.

Eli currently serves as the Editor-in-chief of Gucci's queer zine, The Chime Zine. “Gender-based discrimination, oppression and violence take many different forms,” he says. “Having a global perspective is essential to the mission of Chime for Change and The Chime Zine." Chime for Change is a global campaign founded by Gucci in 2013 to convene, unite and strengthen the voices speaking out for gender equality.

In June 2020, he published his first book, The New Queer Conscience, a part of Penguin Teen's "Pocket Change Collective Series" with Alok Vaid-Menon, Kimberly Drew, and Xiuhtezcatl Martinez.

Recognition 
Eli has been recognized in Out magazine's annual Out100 list (in 2018), Logo TV's Logo30 list, and Out magazine's "Most Eligible Bachelor’s of 2018".

Personal 
Eli is Jewish and identifies as queer, and credits his Judaism as "the impetus for [his] queer activism." Eli's mother was an activist in the Soviet Jewry movement. His father is a Microsurgeon who specializes in male infertility and sexual dysfunction.

References 

American LGBT writers
Gay men
American LGBT rights activists
Jewish activists
Jewish American writers
1990 births
Living people
21st-century American Jews
21st-century LGBT people